Oakley Green is a village in the eastern part of the civil parish of Bray in the English county of Berkshire.

Etymology
Its toponym is derived from "Oak Clearing," and a green used as common pasture by farmers of the parish.

History
The area is the purported site of the battle of Acleah, in 851, between King Æthelwulf of Wessex and the Danes, resulting in a victory for Æthelwulf. It grew as a small village linking the route between Windsor and Reading, serving as a stop for packhorse traders.

References

External links

Bray, Berkshire
Villages in Berkshire